The Publicity Department of the Central Committee of the Communist Party of China, also known as the Propaganda Department or Central Propaganda Department, is an internal division of the Central Committee of the Chinese Communist Party (CCP) in charge of spreading its ideology, media regulation, as well as creation and dissemination of propaganda. The department is also one of the main entities that enforces media censorship and control in the People's Republic of China.

It was founded in May 1924, and was suspended during the Cultural Revolution, until it was restored in October 1977. In 2018, the newly created National Radio and Television Administration was put under its control. The department is a key organ in the CCP's propaganda system, and its inner operations are highly secretive.

Name
The CCPPD has several Chinese names with various different English translations. Officially it is the Zhōngguó Gòngchăndǎng Zhōngyāng Wěiyuánhuì Xuānchuánbù "Chinese Communist Party Central Committee Publicity Department" or Zhōnggòng Zhōngyāng Xuānchuánbù "Chinese Communist Party Central Publicity Department" or "Central Publicity Department of the Communist Party of China", colloquially abbreviated as the Zhōnggòng Xuānchuánbù "Chinese Communist Party Publicity Department" or "Publicity Department of the Communist Party of China", or simply Zhōng xuānbù 中宣部.

The term xuanchuan (宣传 "propaganda; publicity") can have either a neutral connotation in official government contexts or a pejorative connotation in informal contexts. Some xuanchuan collocations usually refer to "propaganda" (e.g., xuānchuánzhàn 宣传战 "propaganda war"), others to "publicity" (xuānchuán méijiè 宣传媒介 "mass media; means of publicity"), and still others are ambiguous (xuānchuányuán 宣传员 "propagandist; publicist").

The Zhōnggòng Zhōngyāng Xuānchuán Bù changed its official English name from "Propaganda Department of the Communist Party of China" to "Publicity Department of the Communist Party of China". As China's involvement in world affairs grew in the 1990s, the CCP became sensitive to the negative connotations of the English translation propaganda for xuanchuan. Official replacement translations include publicity, information, and political communication When Ding Guangen traveled abroad on official visits, he was known as the Minister of Information.

External names

Under the "one institution with two names" system, the Central Propaganda Department has several external names it uses when dealing with a particular manner (i.e., a public government statement). These names include:

 State Council Information Office (SCIO, absorbed in 2014)
 National Press and Publication Administration (NPPA, 国家新闻出版署)
 National Copyright Administration (NCA, 国家版权局)
 China Film Administration (CFA, 国家电影局)
The Central Propaganda Department owns and runs the following organizations:

The department also directly owns the following state-owned enterprises:

 China Film Group Corporation
 China Book Publishing House
 China International Communication Center
 China Intercontinental Press

Function

The Central Propaganda Department has a "direct leadership" role in the media control system, working with other organizations like the National Radio and Television Administration. According to Bill Schiller of the Toronto Star, its scope is to control licensing of media outlets, and to give instructions to the media on what is and what is not to be said, especially about certain issues, like Taiwan, Tibet, etc., that can affect state security, or the rule of the CCP. He says its central offices are located in an unmarked building near the Zhongnanhai at 5 West Chang'an Avenue, although the department has offices throughout the country at the provincial, municipal, and county level.

Schiller says the editors-in-chief of China's major media outlets must attend the department's central office weekly to receive instructions on which stories should be emphasized, downplayed, or not reported at all. These instructions are not normally known to the public, but are communicated to media workers at the weekly meeting or via secret bulletins. However, since the rise of social networking tools, Propaganda Department instructions have been leaked to the internet. Examples presented by Schiller include "All websites need to use bright red color to promote a celebratory atmosphere [of the 60th anniversary of the People's Republic]" and "negative reports... not exceed 30 per cent".

Propaganda Department directives are enforced by disciplines within the CCP, as all media in China are required to be loyal to the CCP, and are to serve as propaganda organs for the CCP in principle. Operational and reporting freedom increased in the Chinese media in the early 2000s. However, open defiance against the Propaganda Department directives is rare, as dissenting media organizations risk severe punishment, including restructuring or closure. In 2000, a system of warnings was introduced for individual journalists, whereby repeat offenses can lead to dismissal. Chinese journalists disclosing Propaganda Department directives to foreign media may be charged with "divulging state secrets."

One important way the Propaganda Department has ensured that the media system remains well controlled is by ensuring that the boundaries of acceptable reporting are kept "deliberately fuzzy" in an effort to ensure that "news workers self-censor to a critical degree."

Credentialing and monitoring media personnel
According to a report from Freedom House, the Central Propaganda Department is the most important institution for monitoring media personnel and controlling the content of print and visual media.

The report says that the Central Propaganda Department plays a key role in monitoring editors and journalists through a national registration system. It also says that in 2003, the CPD, along with the General Administration of Press and Publication and the State Administration of Press, Publication, Radio, Film, and Television, required Chinese journalists to attend nearly 50 hours of training on Marxism, the role of CCP leadership in the media, copyright law, libel law, national security law, regulations governing news content, and journalistic ethics prior to renewing press identification passes in 2003. The report states that media personnel are required to participate in "ideological training sessions", where they are evaluated for their "loyalty to the party." Further "political indoctrination" courses are said to occur at meetings and training retreats to study party political ideology, and the role of the media in "thought work" (sīxiǎng gōngzuò 思想工作).

, 90 percent of China's newspapers consisted of light stories regarding sport and entertainment, which are rarely regulated.

In 2019, the Media Oversight Office (传媒监管局) of the Central Propaganda Department announced that training and testing of news professionals nationwide would be handled through the "Study Xi, Strong Nation" mobile app.

According to Radio Free Asia, in December 2022, the department issued a directive stating that in order to obtain credentials as a professional journalist, they must pass a national exam and "...must support the leadership of the Communist Party of China, conscientiously study, publicize and implement Xi Jinping’s thoughts on the new era of socialism with Chinese characteristics, resolutely implement the party’s theory, line, principles and policies, and adhere to the correct political direction and public opinion guidance."

Structure
A 1977 directive on the re-establishment of the Central Propaganda Department reveals the structure and organization of the "extremely secretive" body, according to Anne-Marie Brady. The directive states that the department will be set up with one Director and several deputies, and the organizational structure will be set up with one office and five bureaus. The office is in charge of political, secretarial and administrative work, and the five bureaus are: the Bureau of Theory, Bureau of Propaganda and Education, Bureau of Arts and Culture, Bureau of News, and Bureau of Publishing. The directive states that the staff will be fixed at around 200 personnel, selected from propaganda personnel across the country in consultation with the Central Organization Department.

The leadership of the Propaganda Department is selected with guidance from the CCP General Secretary and the Politburo Standing Committee member responsible for the media, while local committees of the Propaganda Department work with lower levels of the party-state hierarchy to transmit content priorities to the media.

New departments and offices were set up in 2004 to deal with the growing demands of information control. One, the Bureau of Public Opinion, is in charge of commissioning public opinion surveys and other relevant research.

Heads of the Department

Further reading

References

External links 
 

Chinese propaganda organisations
Institutions of the Central Committee of the Chinese Communist Party
One institution with multiple names